New Bridgeville is an unincorporated community in York County, Pennsylvania, United States. New Bridgeville has a volunteer fire department.

References

Unincorporated communities in York County, Pennsylvania
Unincorporated communities in Pennsylvania